Rakan Al-Shamlan (born 14 April 1998) is a Saudi Arabian professional footballer who plays as a second-striker and winger for Pro League side Al-Batin.

References

External links

1998 births
Living people
Saudi Arabian footballers
Saudi Arabia youth international footballers
Association football wingers
Al Nassr FC players
Al-Shabab FC (Riyadh) players
Al-Wehda Club (Mecca) players
Al Batin FC players
Saudi Professional League players